Muhammad Nooh Dastgir Butt (born 3 February 1998) is a gold medalist weightlifter from Gujranwala, Pakistan. He won gold medal in Commonwealth Weightlifting Championship 2022.

Personal life 
Muhammad Nooh Dastgir Butt was born on February 3, 1998, in Gujranwala. He belongs to a Kashmiri weightlifting family. His father Ghulam Dastgir Butt, who also participated in the international weightlifting events, is coach of Nooh and his brother Hanzala Dastgir Butt (weightlifter, also participated in CWC 2022).

Career 
Butt won the bronze medal in 105+ kg weightlifting competition in the 2018 Commonwealth Games. After lifting 173 kg in snatch, he successfully lifted 222 kg in his first attempt of clean and jerk to confirm his medal. In an attempt to turn it into a gold, Nooh attempted 228 kg in 2nd and 231 kg in third attempt but couldn’t do it successfully.

He also won a bronze medal in Commonwealth Games junior championships at Penang, Malaysia in 2016 and Pune, India in 2015. He lifted 395 kg in junior championships, which is a junior commonwealth record.

On 3 August 2022, Butt won Pakistan's first gold medal at the 2022 Commonwealth Games when he won the men's +109 kg weightlifting event. He lifted 173 kg in the snatch category, and 232 kg in clean and jerk, both Commonwealth Games records, for a combined 405 kg.

References

External links

Living people
Sportspeople from Gujranwala
Weightlifters at the 2018 Commonwealth Games
Weightlifters at the 2022 Commonwealth Games
Pakistani male weightlifters
Commonwealth Games medallists in weightlifting
Commonwealth Games gold medallists for Pakistan
Commonwealth Games bronze medallists for Pakistan
Weightlifters at the 2018 Asian Games
Asian Games competitors for Pakistan
1998 births
20th-century Pakistani people
21st-century Pakistani people
Medallists at the 2022 Commonwealth Games